The highest-selling albums in Australia are ranked in the Australian Recording Industry Association albums chart, also known as the ARIA Charts, published by the Australian Recording Industry Association (ARIA). The data are compiled from a sample that includes music stores, music departments at electronics and department stores and Internet sales, in other words, both digital as well as CD sales. ARIA also issues a weekly singles chart and an end of year albums and singles chart, among other charts.

Alternative rock band Kings of Leon's Only by the Night had the longest non-consecutive run among the releases that have reached peak position in 2008; it spent 14 non-consecutive weeks atop the chart, beginning with the week of 29 September and continuing into the 2009 chart year. Funhouse by Pink, which spent nine weeks at number one, had the longest consecutive run at number one. Other albums with extended chart runs include Sleep Through the Static by Jack Johnson, which spent six weeks at number one, Timbaland Presents Shock Value by Timbaland and Mamma Mia! The Movie Soundtrack Featuring the Songs of ABBA by the cast of the film Mamma Mia!, both of which spent five weeks at number one.

Only by the Night is also the best-selling album of 2008; 422,108 copies have been sold, exceeding the second best-selling album of the year, pop singer Pink's Funhouse, by 3,000 copies. Apocalypso by The Presets spent one week atop the chart on 21 April, and won the ARIA awards for Album of the Year and Best Dance release.

Chart history

See also
2008 in music
List of number-one singles in Australia in 2008
List of Top 25 albums for 2008 in Australia

References

2008
Number one albums
Australia Albums